Pycnocaris is a genus of shrimps belonging to the family Palaemonidae.

The species of this genus are found in Southeastern Asia.

Species:
 Pycnocaris chagoae Bruce, 1972

References

Palaemonidae